A hind is a female deer, especially a red deer.

Places 
 Hind (Sasanian province, 262-484)
 Hind and al-Hind, a Persian and Arabic name for the Indian subcontinent
 Hind (crater), a lunar impact crater
 1897 Hind, an asteroid

Military 
 , numerous Royal Navy ships
 Mil Mi-24, a helicopter, codenamed "Hind" by NATO
 Hawker Hind, a Royal Air Force light bomber

People 
 Hind (name)
 Hind (singer), Bahraini singer
 Hind (singer), Dutch singer also known as Hind Laroussi
 Henry Youle Hind, British geologist and explorer

Other uses 
 Hind (video game), a helicopter game simulation by Digital Integration
 Epinephelus, a genus of groupers (fish) sometimes referred to as hinds
 Ceryneian Hind, a hind in Greek mythology

See also 
 
 Hinds (disambiguation)
 Hindi (disambiguation)
 Hindustan (disambiguation)
 Hindustani (disambiguation)
 Hinde (surname)
 Rear (disambiguation)